This is a list of all of the songs that F.B.T. Productions has produced, including songs for Eminem, George Clinton and others.

1984

Dreamboy - Dreamboy
"Don't Go"
"I Promise (I Do Love You)"

1995

Soul Intent - Fuckin' Backstabber
Whole album

1996

Infinite
Whole album

1997

Eminem - Slim Shady EP
Whole album

1999

Eminem - The Slim Shady LP
"Public Service Announcement"
"Brain Damage"
"If I Had"
"97 Bonnie & Clyde"
"My Fault"
"Cum on Everybody"
"Rock Bottom"
"Just Don't Give a Fuck"
"As the World Turns"
"I'm Shady"
"Bad Meets Evil"
"Still Don't Give a Fuck"

2000

Eminem - The Marshall Mathers LP
”Public Service Announcement 2000”
"Marshall Mathers"
"Drug Ballad"
"Amityville"
"Kim"
"Under the Influence"
"Criminal"
"The Kids"

2001

D12 - Devil's Night
"Another Public Service Announcement"
"American Psycho"
"Purple Pills"
"Instigator"
"Pimp Like Me"
"Blow My Buzz"
"Devils Night"
"These Drugs"

2002

Eminem - The Eminem Show
"White America"
"Square Dance"
"Cleanin' Out My Closet"
"Without Me"
"Sing for the Moment"
"Superman"

Eminem - 8 Mile
"Lose Yourself"

2003

King Gordy - The Entity
"Nightmares"
"The Pain"
"Fight" 
"When Darkness Falls"
"Pass Me A Lighter"
"No Lights"  
"We Violent"
"Stress"

2005

Bizarre - Hannicap Circus
 "Public Service Announcement (Skit)" (featuring Jeff Bass)

Tony Yayo - Thoughts of a Predicate Felon
"Drama Setter"

2007

T.I. - T.I. vs. T.I.P.
"Touchdown"

2008

George Clinton - George Clinton and His Gangsters of Love
Whole album

2009

Eminem - Relapse
"Beautiful"
"Underground/Ken Kaniff"

Production discographies

Discographies of American artists
Hip hop discographies